The Complete Sussman Lawrence (1979–1985) is the 2004 2CD reissue on Deep Shag Records of Sussman Lawrence's two rare indie albums—Hail to the Modern Hero! (1980) and Pop City (1984)—which includes four rare bonus tracks. As the singer, songwriter and guitarist for the band, this set contains the earliest recordings of Peter Himmelman.

Both albums were recorded at the height of Sussman Lawrence’s creative genius in sculpting a sound that veteran Billboard writer Jim Bessman, who covered the group for Variety, aptly called a cross between Bruce Springsteen and Elvis Costello.

Track listing
DISC ONE (Hail To The Modern Hero!)
Shelly's Dog
Rock Slow
Ode To Another Egg
Where Are The Leaders
Another Song About Erections
The Way You Touch
So Hard And Shiny
Information
Cast Away For Merchandise
Modern Saint*
Fortunate*
Hard Rock Tambourine*
Tough Suction (live)*
(*) unreleased bonus tracks

DISC TWO (Pop City)
Torture Me
She's The Living End
(I Really Don't Love You But)I Sure Do Like You A Lot
The Fifth Of August
House On Fire
Fireman
Naturally (You're Artificial)
Closer, Closer
1.5 BMMPH
Made To Order
Hope
Listen Up
Pajama Party
The Strangest Emotion
Bitter World
The Sperm Song
Baby Let Me Be Your Cigarette
Luxury
Call Me On Monday
Love Is A Fight

External links
Deep Shag Records listing for the album
Peter Himmelman – official website

2004 compilation albums
Sussman Lawrence albums
Deep Shag Records albums